Abraham's Bay(named after Abraham Charlton) is a town in the Bahamas. It is located on the south side of Mayaguana island and has a population of 143.(2010 Census)

Notable places
Notable places include:
Charlton House(former homestead of one of the prominent local families, including the Charlton family)
Zion Baptist Church and Church of God of Prophecy.

References

External links
 World Gazetteer

Populated places in the Bahamas